The 29th Golden Melody Awards took place in Taipei, Taiwan in 2018. The award ceremony for the popular music categories was hosted by Jam Hsiao and broadcast on TTV on 23 June.

Winners and nominees
Below is the list of winners and nominees for the popular music categories.

References

External links

Golden Melody Awards
Golden Melody Awards
Golden Melody Awards
Golden Melody Awards